Polonium sulfide is an inorganic compound of polonium and sulfur with the chemical formula PoS. The compound is radioactive and forms black crystals.

Synthesis
1. Passing hydrogen sulfide through an acidic solution of a polonium(II) salt:
PoCl2 + H2S -> PoS + 2HCl

2. Reaction of ammonium sulfide aqueous solution with polonium(II) hydroxide:
(NH4)2S + Po(OH)2 -> 2NH3 + 2H2O + PoS

Physical properties
Polonium sulfide forms black solid crystals, insoluble in water, ammonium sulfide, ethanol, acetone, or toluene.

Chemical properties
Polonium sulfide has strong reducing properties and can be oxidized by chlorine water, bromine water, sodium hypochlorite, and aqua regia. Polonium sulfide is also unstable to heating. It decomposes into elemental polonium and elemental sulfur when heated to 274.85°C in a vacuum:

PoS -> Po + S

Reacts with concentrated acids:

PoS + 2HCl -> PoCl2 + H2S

Applications
Used in the isolation and purification of polonium.

References

Polonium compounds
Sulfides